Robert FitzRoy (1805–1865) was a Royal Navy vice admiral known for being captain of HMS Beagle during Charles Darwin's voyage.

Admiral FitzRoy may also refer to:

Henry FitzRoy, Duke of Richmond and Somerset (1519–1536), Lord High Admiral of England, an honorary title with no corresponding authority
Robert O'Brien FitzRoy (1839–1896), British Royal Navy vice admiral
Lord William FitzRoy (1782–1857), British Royal Navy rear admiral